Song Young-han (born 12 July 1991), also known as Younghan Song, is a South Korean professional golfer.

Song plays on the Korean Tour and the Japan Golf Tour. On the Korean Tour he has three runner-up finishes and finished 11th on the 2013 money list. On the Japan Golf Tour, he had three runner-up finishes before winning the first tournament of the 2016 season, the SMBC Singapore Open. He finished 15th on the money list in 2015.

Song also played on the OneAsia Tour from 2012 to 2014 and finished 8th on the Order of Merit in 2013.

Professional wins (1)

Japan Golf Tour wins (1)

1Co-sanctioned by the Asian Tour

Japan Golf Tour playoff record (0–1)

Results in major championships

CUT = missed the half-way cut
"T" = tied

Results in World Golf Championships

"T" = Tied

References

External links

South Korean male golfers
Japan Golf Tour golfers
1991 births
Living people